Eutychides  of Sicyon in Corinthia, Greek sculptor of the early part of the 3rd century BC, was a pupil of Lysippus. His most noted work was a statue of the Tyche of Antioch, a goddess who embodied the idea of the then newly founded city of Antioch. The Tyche was seated on a rock, crowned with towers, and having the river Orontes at her feet. There is a small copy of the statue in the Vatican. It was imitated by a number of Asiatic cities; and indeed most statues since created that commemorate cities borrow something from the work of Eutychides.

At the invitation of king Areus, Eutychides spent some time in Sparta, where he made a statue of the Eurotas river, and perhaps another of a seated Herakles, in the 280s or 270s.

List of known works 

 Tyche of Antioch
 Allegory of the Eurotas river, in Sparta
 Allegory of the Nile
 Allegory of the Orontes river
 Herakles seated and reclining on his mace, in Sparta

References

Attribution:

Bibliography 

 Bernard Legras & Jacqueline Christien, Dialogues d'histoire ancienne Supplément N° 11, Sparte hellénistique, IVe-IIIe siècles avant notre ère, Presses universitaires de Franche-Comté, 2014. 
 Daniel Ogden, The Legend of Seleucus, Kingship, Narrative and Mythmaking in the Ancient Greek World, Cambridge University Press, 2017. 

4th-century BC Greek sculptors
Ancient Greek sculptors
Hellenistic sculptors
Ancient Sicyonians
People of the Seleucid Empire